The 1909 East Limerick by-election was held on 10 June 1909.  The by-election was held due to the death of the incumbent Irish Parliamentary MP, William Lundon.  It was won by the Irish Parliamentary candidate, his son Thomas Lundon.

References

1909 elections in the United Kingdom
By-elections to the Parliament of the United Kingdom in County Limerick constituencies
1909 elections in Ireland